Graham Henry McGhee (born 24 September 1981, in Coatbridge), is a Scottish football defender who plays for Scottish junior side Lesmahagow.

McGhee came through the Clyde youth system and captained the Under 19 and Reserve teams. McGhee made 6 appearances for the Clyde first team, before joining East Stirlingshire in 2001. He spent  years at Firs Park, making 151 appearances in total before signing for Albion Rovers. He dropped out of the senior game in 2007, to join Lesmahagow.

External links

Living people
1981 births
Scottish footballers
Clyde F.C. players
East Stirlingshire F.C. players
Albion Rovers F.C. players
Scottish Football League players
Association football defenders
Footballers from Coatbridge
Lesmahagow F.C. players
Scottish Junior Football Association players